Sanders House may refer to:
 Sanders House (Little Rock, Arkansas), listed on the NRHP in Arkansas
Sanders-Hollabaugh House, Marshall, AR, listed on the NRHP in Arkansas
Durham Sanders House, Campbellsville, KY, listed on the NRHP in Kentucky
Robert Sanders House, Georgetown, KY, listed on the NRHP in Kentucky
Jared Young Sanders, Jr., House, Baton Rouge, LA, listed on the NRHP in Louisiana
G. O. Sanders House, Hudson, NH, listed on the NRHP in New Hampshire
James Sanders House, Little Falls, NY, listed on the NRHP in New York
Sanders-Hairr House, Clayton, NC, listed on the NRHP in North Carolina
Watson-Sanders House, Smithfield, NC, listed on the NRHP in North Carolina
 Sanders House (Beaumont, Texas), listed on the NRHP in Texas
William Edward Sanders House, Burton, TX, listed on the NRHP in Texas
Walter McDonald Sanders House, Bluefield, VA, listed on the NRHP in Virginia
Sanders Farm, Max Meadows, VA, listed on the NRHP in Virginia
Erick Gustave Sanders Mansion, Kent, WA, listed on the NRHP in Washington